Andrew Jackson State Office Building is a skyscraper in Nashville, Tennessee, U.S.. It was designed in the International Style by Taylor & Crabtree, and completed in 1969. Its construction cost $10 million (equivalent to $ in ).

Initial tenants in 1970 included the "Tennessee Department of Personnel, Revenue and Corrections, Higher Education Commission, Industrial Development, and some branches of the State's Comptroller's Office" as well as the Tennessee Department of Safety.

It was named for President Andrew Jackson.  The adjacent Rachel Jackson State Office Building is named for the first lady.

References

Buildings and structures in Nashville, Tennessee
Buildings and structures completed in 1969
International style architecture in Tennessee